Euryzonella is a monotypic snout moth genus described by Jean Ghesquière in 1942. Its only species, Euryzonella latisfascia, described by George Hampson in 1891, is found in India.

References

Pyralinae
Monotypic moth genera
Moths of Asia
Pyralidae genera